Lamachodes is a genus of stick insects in the tribe Necrosciini, erected by Josef Redtenbacher in 1908.   To date (2022) species have been recorded only from Vietnam.

Species
The Phasmida Species File lists:
 Lamachodes brocki Ho, 2018
 Lamachodes laevis Redtenbacher, 1908 - type species

References

External links

Phasmatodea genera
Phasmatodea of Asia
Lonchodidae